In enzymology, a precorrin-8X methylmutase is an enzyme that catalyzes the chemical reaction

precorrin-8X  hydrogenobyrinate

Hence, this enzyme has one substrate, precorrin 8X, and one product, hydrogenobyrinate.

This enzyme belongs to the family of isomerases, specifically those intramolecular transferases transferring other groups.  The systematic name of this enzyme class is precorrin-8X 11,12-methylmutase. Other names in common use include precorrin isomerase, hydrogenobyrinic acid-binding protein and CobH. This enzyme is part of the biosynthetic pathway to cobalamin (vitamin B12) in aerobic bacteria.

See also
 Cobalamin biosynthesis

Structural studies

References

 
 
 
 

EC 5.4.99
Enzymes of known structure